"¿Quién Me Iba a Decir?", is the first official single released from David Bisbal's album Premonición. The single premiered on 25 August 2006. The remix of the song features popular reggaeton duo RKM & Ken-Y.

Charts

Spanish songs
Number-one singles in Spain
Spanish-language songs
David Bisbal songs
2006 singles
2006 songs
Universal Music Latino singles
Songs written by Kike Santander